Actibacterium pelagium is a Gram-negative, rod-shaped and non-motile bacterium from the genus of Actibacterium which has been isolated from seawater from the Pacific Ocean.

References

External links

Type strain of Actibacterium pelagium at BacDive -  the Bacterial Diversity Metadatabase

Rhodobacteraceae
Bacteria described in 2017